Blandin is a surname. People with this surname include:

Amos Noyes Blandin Jr. (1896–1982), Justice of the New Hampshire Supreme Court
Eric Blandin (fl. 1990s–2020s), French aerodynamicist
Ernie Blandin (1919–1968), American football tackle
J. P. Blandin (fl. 1980s–2010s), American college baseball coach and former pitcher
Marie-Christine Blandin (born 1952), member of the Senate of France
Philippe-Frédéric Blandin (1798–1849), French surgeon
William Grant Blandin, birth name of Romaine Fielding (1867–1927), American actor, screenwriter, and silent film director

See also
Blanding (disambiguation)
Blandón